Saint Ruth or St Ruth's may refer to:
 St Ruth, Queensland, Australian locality
 St. Ruth Missionary Baptist Church, Dania Beach, Florida, U.S.A.
 Ruthenius, martyred companion of Saint Denis of Paris
 Ruth (biblical figure), a Moabite who marries an Israelite in the Hebrew Bible
 Charles Chalmot de Saint-Ruhe (c. 1650 – 12 July 1691), a French cavalry officer erroneously called "Saint-Ruth" in many English-language sources

See also
 Struth, commune in Bas-Rhin, France